Sean Henry (born 1965, Woking, Surrey) is a British sculptor, based in Hampshire, England.  His work includes private and public installations in many locations across Europe and the USA.  Fusing the disciplines of ceramics with those of sculpture to create a fresh, innovative approach to representing the human figure, Henry's painted figures have helped to revive the long tradition of polychrome sculpture.

Early life
Henry grew up in Surrey, England and studied at Farnham School of Art (now University for the Creative Arts) before taking a BA in ceramics at Bristol Polytechnic from 1984 to 1987. He was the visiting artist at the University of California from 1991 to 1992, and won the Villiers David Prize in 1998, becoming the first sculptor to win the award.

Works

His works include Walking Man in London's Holland Park (1998) and Man with Potential Selves in the centre of Newcastle upon Tyne (2001).  Editions of Walking Woman can be found in London, Oslo, Bad Homburg and Colchester, Essex.  He completed the UK's first permanent offshore sculpture, Couple, in 2007, a critically acclaimed 13m high sculpture located 300m off the coast of Northumberland in Newbiggin Bay.  Other noteworthy works include Standing Man in Stockholm (2010), Lying Man at the Frederick Meijer Gardens and Sculpture Park in Michigan, USA (2011).  More recently Seated Figure, a 3m high sculpture can be seen located within the North York Moors National Park (2017). In 2019 Seated Figure was removed from its location on Castleton Rigg amid concerns that the large number of visitors it was attracting were damaging the local moorland. It was moved to the Yorkshire Sculpture Park in Wakefield.

2017-2020 saw seven of Henry's works being permanently installed in various locations across Woking, Surrey, included Seated Man (2011) and the powerful figure of The Wanderer (2013) inside and outside Woking train station.  In Jubilee Square, the contemplative Standing Man (2009) now mixes with pedestrians, and in 2020 the final cast of Catafalque (2003) will join the collection in the newly completed Victoria Square.

Henry describes the theme of his work as “the tension between the making and staging of figures that seem to belong to the real world, and the degree to which they echo our experiences and sympathies”.   Art historian Tom Flynn has said "through vigorously expressive modelling Henry imbues his figures with a powerful psychological presence, the theme of life and death a constant subtext".

Henry's first solo show was in London in 1988 and he has since gone on to exhibit his work widely in both solo and group exhibitions in the UK, USA, Sweden, Germany, Holland, Italy, Australia, Greece and Switzerland.

In 2008, Scala Publishers published a comprehensive monograph on Henry's work, written by the art historian Tom Flynn. This was followed in 2011 by a second Scala publication Conflux: A Union of the Sacred and the Anonymous to mark Henry's solo exhibition of 22 figures at Salisbury Cathedral.<ref>Morris, Anne. Contemporary_meets_medieval, Salisbury Journal, Salisbury, 28 July 2011. Retrieved 2012-02-29.</ref>  In 2015 the National Portrait Gallery in London commissioned Henry to create a painted bronze sculpture of Sir Tim Berners-Lee, the founder of the World Wide Web.  Henry has been represented by the Osborne Samuel Galler in London since 1999, and by Galleri Andersson Sandström in Sweden since 2004.

Notable worksSeated Figure  (2017) North York Moors National Park, and The Hills, Queenstown, NZ
 Woman (Being Looked At) (2005) Strandverket, Sweden, Folketheatret, Oslo and Woking Town Centre, UKTim Berners-Lee" (2015) National Portrait Gallery, London, England
Catafalque (2003/2011) Frederik Meijer Gardens & Sculpture Park, Michigan, USA, the Seven Bridges Foundation, Connecticut, USA, and the University of Boras, Sweden
Lying Man (2003/2011) Frederik Meijer Gardens & Sculpture Park, Michigan, USA.
Standing Man (2009) Stockholm City Collection, Stockholm, Sweden
Walking Woman (2008) Christian Ringes - Ekeberg Sculpture Park, Oslo, Norway
Multi-figure installation (2008) Standard Chartered Bank, London, UK
Couple (2007) Newbiggin-by-the-Sea, Northumberland, UK.
Folly (The Other Self) 2007–2011) Cass Sculpture Foundation, Goodwood, Sussex, UK
Meeting Place (2003) Paddington Central Development, London, UK
Man with Potential Selves (2003) Newcastle City Collection, Newcastle upon Tyne, UK, Le Meridien Cumberland Hotel, Marble Arch, London, UK and Umedalen skulpturepark, Umea City Collection, Umea, Sweden
Two Figures (2003) Sheldon Square, Paddington Basin, London, UK
T.P.O.L.R. (2002) The Seavest Collection, Florida, USA
Ben (Ideas Unresolved) (2001) University of Virginia Art Museum, Charlottesville, VA, USA
Walking Man (1998) Holland Park, Royal Borough of Kensington & Chelsea, London, UK
Hard to Swallow (1991) Arizona State University Museum, Arizona, USA

Books and Catalogues

 Howard Jacobson ‘TIME BEING’ Osborne Samuel, 64p, 210 x 260 mm 2016
 Aidan Dunne ‘SEAN HENRY’ Forum Gallery, New York, 28 p, 216 x 280 mm, 2015
 Sean Henry, Tom Flynn ‘Aidan Dunne ‘SEAN HENRY’ Galleri Andersson Sandström, Sweden, 36 p, 210 x 210 mm, 2014
 Peter Osborne, Tom Flynn, Sean Henry ‘SEAN HENRY AT GLYNDEBOURNE’ Osborne Samuel, 36p, 235 x 180 mm, 2013
 Ann Elliot ‘THE WAY IT IS’ Osborne Samuel, 46 p, 280 x 220 mm, 2012
 Richard Cork, Tom Flynn ‘CONFLUX: SEAN HENRY AT SALISBURY CATHEDRAL’ Scala Publishers UK, 72 p, 330 x 250 mm, 2011
 Mark Lawson, Anna Woodford ‘COUPLE’ Inspire Northumberland, 60 p, 260 x 190 mm, 2008
 Tom Flynn ‘SEAN HENRY’ Scala Publishers, UK (Hardback) 160 p, 280 x 240mm, 2008
 Tom Flynn ‘NEW SCULPTURE AND DRAWING’ Osborne Samuel, 24 p, 280 x 160 mm, 2008
 PRESENCE’ Galerie Von Braunbehrens, Germany (Hardback) 104 p, 300 x 230 mm, 2007
 Tom Flynn ‘YOU’RE NOT THE SAME’ Forum Gallery, New York, 34 p, 280 x 190 mm, 2006
 Judith Bouwknegt ‘SEAN HENRY: ITALIA’ Kunsthandel Frans Jacobs, Holland (Hardback) 52 p, 270 x 165 mm, 2005
 Jack Turner, Elspeth Moncrieff ‘HERE AND NOW’ Osborne Samuel, 56 p, 240 x 190 mm, 2004
 Norbert Lynton, Barbara S. Krulik ‘SCULPTURE AND DRAWINGS’ Berkeley Square Gallery, 48 p, 280 x 215 mm, 2001
 Ann Elliot ‘A PILGRIMMAGE’ The Air Gallery, London, 24 p, 210 x 210 mm, 1999
 Edward Lucie Smith, Beatrice Buscaroli, David Hart, Paul Durcan ‘THE CENTRE OF THE UNIVERSE’ Circle Delgi Artisti, Faenza, Italy (Hardback) 63 p, 295 x 220 mm, 1998

References

References

External links

Sean Henry - official website
BBC Wiltshire - Giant Art in Salisbury
Sean Henry, LKFF Art & Sculpture Projects

Living people
1965 births
British sculptors
British male sculptors